Trichospermum peekelii is a plant species in the family Malvaceae. It is found in the Bismarck Islands and Solomon Islands archipelagoes.

Names
T. peekelii is reconstructed as *maRako in the Proto-Oceanic language, the reconstructed ancestor of the Oceanic languages.

References

Flora of the Pacific
peekelii
Taxa named by Max Burret